is a railway station on the Ōu Main Line in the city of Yonezawa, Yamagata Prefecture, Japan, operated by East Japan Railway Company (JR East).

Lines
Itaya Station is served by the Ōu Main Line, and is located 21.2 rail kilometers from the terminus of the line at Fukushima Station.

Station layout
Itaya Station has two unnumbered opposed side platforms connected by a level crossing. The switching point of the tracks is protected by a snow shelter due to the heavy snowfall in the area in winter. The station is unattended.

Platforms

History
Itaya Station was opened on 15 May 1899. The station was absorbed into the JR East network upon the privatization of JNR on 1 April 1987.

Future plans 
The station will be bypassed by all trains between 10 January 2023 and 26 March 2023 owing to extremely low ridership.

Surrounding area
 
    Kuriko International Ski & Resort

See also
List of Railway Stations in Japan

References

External links

 JR East station information 

Stations of East Japan Railway Company
Railway stations in Yamagata Prefecture
Ōu Main Line
Railway stations in Japan opened in 1899
Yonezawa, Yamagata